Eubaphe unicolor is a species of geometrid moth in the family Geometridae. It is found throughout North America to South America.

The MONA or Hodges number for Eubaphe unicolor is 7444.

Subspecies
These two subspecies belong to the species Eubaphe unicolor:
 Eubaphe unicolor unicolor
 Eubaphe unicolor venustata Fletcher, 1954

References

Further reading

External links

 

Eudulini
Articles created by Qbugbot
Moths described in 1869